The M1934/39 helmet was the primary combat helmet used by the Greek Armed Forces during the Second World War.  Greece purchased these helmets from Italy prior to the conflict as a replacement for their World War I-era Adrian helmets and refitted them with locally manufactured liners.

Background
The M1934/39 was initially produced and tested in Italy as a possible replacement for the Italian military's Adrian helmets. The helmet did not meet their standards however, and they were sold to Greece as bare shells just before the outbreak of World War II. Once the Greeks received the M1934/39's they painted them green and added their own liners and chin straps. These liners were made from leather and featured seven 'tongues'. One of the 'tongues' was marked with a crown and the words ΕΛΛΗΝΙΚΟΣ ΣΤΡΑΤΟΣ ("Greek Army"). Due to the sudden onset of hostilities between Greece and Italy, Greece did not receive the total number of helmets ordered and as a result, was unable to equip their entire army with the M1934/39.

World War II and beyond
After Italian and German forces overran Greece in 1941 (see Battle of Greece) many captured M1934/39's were reissued to occupying troops and used within the country until the end of the war. Once hostilities ceased in 1945 however, Greek authorities refitted a large number of these helmets with British-style leather liners and put them back into service with various police units until the 1960s.

Gallery

References

External links

 Greek M1934/39 helmet at www.warrelics.eu
 Greek M1934/39 helmet at www.militariarg.com
 Greek M1934/39 helmet at www.nyc-techwriters.com

Combat helmets of Italy
Hellenic Army
World War II military equipment of Greece
Military equipment introduced in the 1930s